The following events occurred in February 1963:

February 1, 1963 (Friday)
At Ulus Square in Ankara, 87 people were killed and 200 injured when a Vickers 754D Viscount airliner fell into a crowd in the Turkish city. Middle East Airlines Flight 265, with 14 people on board, was descending for a landing at Ankara after departing from Nicosia in Cyprus. At the same time, a Turkish Air Force C-47 airplane with a crew of three was approaching the same airport after a training flight. The wreckage of the Vickers Viscount fell into the crowd below, 20 seconds later. 
The collapse of a school chapel killed 104 people, mostly schoolgirls, during prayer services in the town of Biblián, in Ecuador. There were 450 people inside when the roof fell under heavy rains. 
Kenneth S. Kleinknecht, manager of the Mercury Project Office, reported the cancellation of a peroxide expulsion experiment previously planned for the Mercury-Atlas 9 mission. Kleinknecht noted the zodiacal light experiment would proceed and that the astronaut's gloves were being modified to facilitate camera operation.

February 2, 1963 (Saturday)
Kim Jong-pil founded South Korea's Democratic Republican Party. Kim would be forced into exile three weeks later, on February 24.
General Ivan Serov was dismissed from his job as Director of the GRU and replaced by Pyotr Ivashutin.
Pentti Nikula of Finland broke the world record for the pole vault, which had been held by a succession of Americans for almost 35 years. Nikula cleared the bar at 4.94 meters (16 feet,  inches) using a fiberglass pole.
The Beatles went on tour at the bottom of an eight-act bill headed by 16-year-old singer Helen Shapiro.
Born: Eva Cassidy, American singer, in Washington, D.C. (died 1996)
Died: Patrick Kerwin, 73, Chief Justice of Canada since 1954

February 3, 1963 (Sunday)
Elections were held in Nicaragua for the President, the 42-member Chamber of Deputies, and the 16 member Senate. Evidence of massive impending fraud caused the Traditional Conservative Party, led by Fernando Agüero Rocha, to abandon its loyalist stance and to call for a boycott of the 1963 elections.   René Schick Gutiérrez of the Nationalist Liberal Party, considered a puppet of Luis Somoza and the Somoza family that had ruled since 1932, officially won 90 percent of the vote over the Conservatives Diego Manuel Chamorro. Somoza's party also won two-thirds of the seats in the Chamber and 75% of the Senate seats.
On orders from Prime Minister Lee Kuan Yew, Operation Coldstore was carried out in Singapore, with the arrest of more than 150 journalists, labor and student leaders, and members of political parties that opposed Lee's People's Action Party (PAP). The detainees were kept at the Outram Road Prison for three months; with the leaders of the Barisan Sosialis and other parties forced out of campaigning, the PAP would capture 2/3rds of the seats in the parliamentary elections, and maintain control thereafter.
Canadian Minister of National Defence Douglas Harkness resigned in disagreement over the nuclear policies of Prime Minister Diefenbaker, triggering the collapse of the rest of the ministry.

February 4, 1963 (Monday)
The SS Marine Sulphur Queen, a tanker with a crew of 39 and a cargo of molten sulphur, was heard from for the last time, two days after its departure from Beaumont, Texas en route to Norfolk, Virginia. Contact between the ship and its owner, Marine Transport Lines, Inc., was lost and the ship was reported missing two days later. Debris from the tanker washed ashore in Florida, but a search by U.S. Coast Guard and U.S. Navy airplanes did not locate the ship. The story of the disappearance of the tanker would first be described as a casualty of the "Bermuda Triangle" in the Argosy magazine article (by Vincent Gaddis in its February 1964 issue) "The Deadly Bermuda Triangle", although an investigating panel concluded that the ship, structurally unsound and burdened by its heavy cargo, broke in half during a storm.
The UK Football Association decided to postpone the fifth and sixth rounds of the 1962–63 FA Cup because of delays caused by the severe winter.

February 5, 1963 (Tuesday)
The Canadian House of Commons voted 142-111 in favor of a resolution of no confidence in the government of Prime Minister John Diefenbaker. Parliament was dissolved the next day by Governor-General George Vanier, and elections were scheduled for April 8.
The U.S. Department of State made travel by United States citizens to Cuba illegal on a decision by President John F. Kennedy, in addition to bans on financial and commercial transactions with the Communist nation in the Caribbean.
Manned Spacecraft Center officials announced a delay of the MA-9 scheduled flight date due to electrical wiring problems in the Atlas launch vehicle control system.
From February 5 to 14, personnel of the Manned Spacecraft Center visited the McDonnell plant in St. Louis to conduct a spacecraft status review. Units being inspected were Mercury spacecrafts 15B and 20. In addition, the status of the Gemini Simulator Instructor Console was assessed. With regard to the spacecraft inspection portion, a number of modifications had been made that would affect the simulator trainers. On spacecraft 15B, 15 modifications were made to the control panel and interior, including the relocation of the water separator lights, the addition of water spray and radiation experiment switches and a retropack battery switch. The exterior of the spacecraft underwent changes as well, involving such modifications as electrical connections and redesign of the fuel system for the longer mission. The reviewers found that spacecraft 20 conformed closely to the existing simulator configuration, so that modifications to the simulator were unnecessary.
Crew Systems Division representatives presented results of investigations into equipment and procedures for Project Gemini extravehicular operations. McDonnell was to begin a review of current extravehicular capabilities and to proceed with a study of requirements. Areas of study were to include (1) extent of crew maneuverability with hatch closed and cabin pressurized as currently provided, (2) requirements to allow the crew to stand in open hatches but not actually leave the cabin, and (3) requirements to allow a crew member to leave the cabin and inspect the spacecraft's exterior. McDonnell was directed to provide for extravehicular operations for Gemini spacecraft Nos. 2 and up.
At a Gemini Rendezvous and Reentry Panel meeting on February 5 and 6, it was reported that attempts to obtain information on flight controller procedures to command the Agena target vehicle in orbit had been delayed by the U.S. Air Force Agena security program.
Died:
Abd el-Krim, 77, Moroccan nationalist who fought for independence against France and Britain after Morocco had become a French protectorate in 1911
Barnum Brown, 90, American paleontologist who discovered the first documented Tyrannosaurus rex remains in 1902.

February 6, 1963 (Wednesday)
U.S. Defense Secretary Robert McNamara appeared at a nationally televised press conference from the White House to show proof, with photographs from U-2 spy planes, that all offensive missiles had been removed from Cuba.
Titan II development flight N-16 was launched from Cape Canaveral. This was the eleventh Titan II flight and the third to use increased pressure in the propellant tanks of stage I to reduce longitudinal oscillations (POGO). This was successful in reducing POGO levels to about 0.5 g, more than satisfactory from the standpoint of the weapon system. The Air Force was reluctant to expend weapon system funds in an effort to reduce POGO still further to the 0.25-g level NASA regarded as the maximum acceptable for crewed flight.
Gemini astronaut trainees concluded their formal academic training with a course on orbital mechanics and flight dynamics. Flight crew personnel had been receiving basic science training for two days a week over the past four months. During this period, they also received Gemini spacecraft and launch vehicle familiarization courses and visited several contractor facilities, including McDonnell, Martin, Aerojet, and Lockheed. Among subjects studied were astronomy, physics of the upper atmosphere and space, global meteorology, selenology, guidance and navigation, computers, fluid mechanics, rocket propulsion systems, aerodynamics, communications, environmental control systems, and medical aspects of space flight. Flight-crew training plans for the rest of the year, which were being formulated during February, called for space science and technology seminars, celestial recognition training, monitoring the Mercury-Atlas 9 flight, weightless flying, pressure suit indoctrination, parachute jumping, survival training, instruction in spacecraft systems and launch support, paraglider flying, centrifuge experience, docking practice, and work with the flight simulator.
Died: Piero Manzoni, 29, Italian artist, of a heart attack

February 7, 1963 (Thursday)
In one of New Zealand's worst road accidents ever, a bus crashed after its brakes failed nearing the top of the southern descent of the Brynderwyn Range, killing 15 of the 35 people on board. The bus, bringing back a group of Maori people from a welcome for Queen Elizabeth's visit to Waitangi, plunged over a  embankment, and evoked memories of a December 24, 1953, train crash that killed 151 people who were on their way to Auckland to welcome the Queen to New Zealand.
In the first ballot to select the new leader of Britain's opposition Labour Party, Harold Wilson received 115 votes, George Brown 88, and James Callaghan 41. Since no candidate received a majority of MP votes, a second round would be held on February 14 between Wilson and Brown.
At a Development Engineering Inspection for the Mercury spacecraft 15B mockup, designated for the Mercury-Atlas 10 mission, some 42 requests for alterations were listed.

Simulated off-the-pad Gemini ejection test No. 8 was conducted at Naval Ordnance Test Station. Two dummies were ejected, and for the first time the test incorporated a ballute system. The ballute (for balloon + parachute) had been introduced as a device to stabilize the astronaut after ejection at high altitudes. Ejection seat and dummy separated satisfactorily and the personnel parachute deployed properly; but faults in the test equipment prevented the canopy from fully inflating. The ballute failed to inflate or release properly on either dummy. As a result, the parachute was redesigned to ensure more positive inflation at very low dynamic pressures. The redesigned chute would be tested in a series of five entirely successful dummy drops during March.
"Please Please Me", The Beatles' first single to be sold in the United States, was released by Vee-Jay Records. Only 7,310 copies of the record were bought.

February 8, 1963 (Friday)
A military coup by the Ba'ath Party's Iraqi-wing overthrew the Prime Minister of Iraq, Abd al-Karim Qasim. General Ahmed Hassan al-Bakr became the new Prime Minister and Colonel Abdul Salam Arif became President.
Britain's Royal Navy conducted the worlds first experimental trials of a vertical take-off and landing fixed-wing aircraft aboard an aircraft carrier, testing the Hawker Siddeley P.1127 prototype aboard HMS Ark Royal.
Colonel Kenneth W. Schultz of Headquarters, Air Force Office of Development Planning, outlined Department of Defense objectives in the Gemini program at the first meeting of the Gemini Program Planning Board. He defined three general objectives: conducting orbital experiments related to such possible future missions as the inspection and interception of both cooperative and passive or noncooperative objects in space under a variety of conditions, logistic support of a manned orbiting laboratory, and photo reconnaissance from orbit; gaining military experience and training in all aspects of human spaceflight; and assessing the relationship between human and machine in the areas of potential military missions.
Northrop Ventura successfully completed the first series of 20 drop tests in developing the parachute recovery system for Project Gemini. The first four drops, during the last two weeks of August 1962, used a dummy rendezvous and recovery (R and R) section with the  drogue parachute to determine the rate of descent of the R and R section. Subsequent drops tested the  ring-sail main parachute using boilerplate spacecraft No. 1, a steel mock-up of the Gemini spacecraft ballasted to simulate the weight and center of gravity of the flight article. Boilerplate No. 1, manufactured by McDonnell, was delivered to Northrop Ventura on August 1. Drops Nos. 5 and 6 were simple weight drops to determine the structural characteristics of the main parachute. Through drop No. 13, the main problem was tucking; the edge of the parachute tended to tuck under, hindering full inflation. Drop tests Nos. 5 through 13 were conducted from September through November 1962. The tucking problem was resolved with drop No. 14. Remaining tests in the series demonstrated the structural integrity of the parachute system when deployed at maximum dynamic pressure. Qualification drop tests were expected to begin in April 1963.

February 9, 1963 (Saturday)
The Boeing 727 made its first flight. Pilot S.L. Wallick, copilot R.L. Loesch and flight engineer M.K. Schulenberger took the plane aloft from the company's airfield at Renton, Washington.
The Metropolitan Josyf Slipyj, Archbishop and leader of the Ukrainian Greek Catholic Church and a Roman Catholic cardinal, was allowed to leave Ukraine by the Soviet Union, departing Lviv by train. He would never return, dying in 1984.
Died: Abd al-Karim Qasim, 48, former Prime Minister of Iraq, was executed by a firing squad, one day after being overthrown and only hours after a brief court-martial.

February 10, 1963 (Sunday)
Five Japanese cities located on the northernmost part of Kyūshū were merged to become the city of Kitakyūshū, with a population of more than one million.
U.S. Attorney General Robert F. Kennedy, taking up a challenge made by his brother, the President, for U.S. Marines to meet Teddy Roosevelt's standard for hiking 50 miles within three days, completed the distance in 17 hours and 50 minutes.
Born: Smiley Culture, British reggae singer and DJ, as David Victor Emmanuel in South London (died 2011)

February 11, 1963 (Monday)

The French Chef, one of the most well-known American cooking shows on television, premiered on Boston public television station WGBH in Boston and was hosted by Julia Child, co-author of the book Mastering the Art of French Cooking. The show ran for nine seasons and 206 episodes until 1973.
The CIA's Domestic Operations Division was created.
The Beatles recorded the ten songs of their debut album Please Please Me in a single, 13-hour session at the Abbey Road Studios.
Born: Vivian Yam, Hong Kong chemist
Died: Sylvia Plath, 30, American poet, novelist and short story writer, and author of The Bell Jar, committed suicide at her apartment in London by inhaling carbon monoxide fumes from her gas oven.

February 12, 1963 (Tuesday)
All 43 people on Northwest Orient Airlines Flight 705 were killed when the Boeing 720 broke up in mid-air during a severe thunderstorm shortly after takeoff from Miami International Airport and crashed into the Florida Everglades. The plane departed from Miami at 1:35 pm local time, bound for Chicago, and was cleared to climb to a higher altitude to avoid a thunderstorm.
Construction work began on the Gateway Arch at St. Louis, Missouri, United States.
Objectives of the Mercury-Atlas 9 (MA-9) crewed 1-day mission were published. This was the ninth flight of a production Mercury spacecraft to be boosted by an Atlas launch vehicle and the sixth crewed United States space flight. According to plans, MA-9 would complete almost 22 orbits and be recovered approximately 70 nautical miles from Midway Island in the Pacific Ocean. Primary objectives of the flight were to evaluate the effects of the space environment on an astronaut after more than 1 but less than 2 days in orbit. During this period, close attention would be given to the astronaut's ability to function as a primary operating system of the spacecraft while in a sustained period of weightlessness. The capability of the spacecraft to perform over the extended period of time would be closely monitored. From postflight information, data would be available from the pilot and the spacecraft to ascertain, to a degree, the feasibility of space flights over a much greater period of time - Project Gemini, for example. In addition, the extended duration of the MA-9 mission provided a check on the effectiveness of the worldwide tracking network that could assist in determining the tracking requirement for the advanced human spaceflight programs.
The Manned Spacecraft Center announced a mid-May flight for Mercury-Atlas 9 (MA-9). Originally scheduled for April, the launch date was delayed by a decision to rewire the Mercury-Atlas flight control system, as a result of the launch vehicle checkout at the plant inspection meeting.
Born: Jacqueline Woodson, American children's author; in Columbus, Ohio

February 13, 1963 (Wednesday)
A 7.3 magnitude earthquake occurred off the coast of Taiwan, near Su-ao, Yilan County. Despite its magnitude, the earthquake killed only three people. The dead were highway workers near Taichung who were buried in an avalanche triggered by the tremor.
Residents of the Rwenzori Mountains in the Toro Kingdom region of southwestern Uganda rebelled against the government and declared independence of a state they called the Republic of Ruwenzuru. The Toro independence movement would be defeated in 1970, and a majority of the secessionist leaders would be murdered in 1972.
The first biweekly Network Coordination Meeting was held. Gemini Project Office had established the meetings to ensure the compatabilty of ground network equipment configuration with mission requirements and airborne systems. At a meeting on November 20, 1962, the PCM (Pulse Code Modulation) Working Group had concluded that the Project Gemini telemetry system presented no major compatibility problems.

February 14, 1963 (Thursday)
Syncom 1 was launched from the United States and became the first satellite to be placed into geosynchronous orbit, but failed to function as a communications satellite because its equipment was damaged in the process of being aligned to coincide with the rotation of the Earth.

The Coca-Cola Company introduced its first low calorie soft drink, TaB, a sugar-free cola sweetened with cyclamates rather than sugar, test marketing it in Springfield, Massachusetts. Days later, the Pepsi Cola Company introduced its Patio cola on February 20 in test-marketing in Greenville, South Carolina. Neither drink was the first in the U.S. market. The Royal Crown Cola company, manufacturers of RC Cola, had introduced Diet Rite Cola in 1955. 
Harold Wilson was elected leader of Britain's opposition Labour Party, defeating George Brown, Baron George-Brown 144-103 in the second ballot, and putting Wilson in line to be the nation's next Prime Minister when general elections took place.
The Indian Air Force received its first batch of Soviet fighters, Mikoyan-Gurevich MiG-21s.

February 15, 1963 (Friday)
Television was introduced in Singapore, with one hour per week of programming initially, increasing by April to five hours of programming each weeknight, and 10 hours each on Saturday and Sunday.
The Dutch liner  struck the wreckage of SS Harborough at Bremen, West Germany, and was holed. All 230 passengers and 276 crew were rescued by the German ship SS Gotthilf Hagen. The Maasdam had been three days away from inaugurating direct service between West Germany and the United States.
Agena target vehicle checkout plans were presented at a meeting of the Gemini Management Panel. Upon receipt at Cape Canaveral, the target vehicle would be inspected and certified. After this action, mechanical mate and interface checks with the target docking adapter would be accomplished. Agena-Gemini spacecraft compatibilty tests would then be conducted, and the Agena would undergo validation and weight checks. Subsequently, a joint checkout of the spacecraft and Agena would be conducted with tests on the Merritt Island radar tower.
The Leonard's M&O Subway (later the Tandy Center Subway), the only privately owned subway in the United States, opened in Fort Worth, Texas. It would cease operations in 2002.

February 16, 1963 (Saturday)
Mauritania and Mali signed the Treaty of Kayes at the Malian capital, Bamako, ending a border dispute between the two nations.
At Melodifestivalen 1963, Sweden selected its entry for the 1963 Eurovision Song Contest, "En gång i Stockholm", sung by Monica Zetterlund.
Died: László Lajtha, 70, Hungarian composer, ethnomusicologist and conductor

February 17, 1963 (Sunday)
Toru Terasawa of Japan set a new world record for fastest time in the marathon, winning the Beppu Marathon in 2 hours, 15 minutes and 16 seconds.
Turkey accepted the proposal to remove the remaining Jupiter nuclear missiles based there by the United States, with the last of the weapons taken out by April 24; nuclear defense of Turkey would be replaced by Polaris submarines.
African-American activist W. E. B. Du Bois renounced his American citizenship and became a citizen of Ghana, six months before his death.
Born: Michael Jordan, American basketball player, five time NBA Most Valuable Player Award for the National Basketball Association (in 1988, 1991, 1992, 1996 and 1998), and later owner of the NBA Charlotte Hornets team; in Brooklyn, New York

February 18, 1963 (Monday)
Mount Agung, a dormant volcano on the Indonesian island of Bali, became active again for the first time in 120 years. Its lava flow would destroy villages in the vicinity and kill more than 1,000 people.
Between February 18 and 22, the McDonnell Aircraft Corporation reported to the Manned Spacecraft Center on the results of Project Orbit Run 109. This test run completed a 100-hour full-scale simulated mission, less the reaction control system operation, to demonstrate the 1-day mission capability of the Mercury spacecraft. Again, as in earlier runs, the MA-9/20 flight plan served as the guideline, including the use of onboard supplies of electrical power, oxygen, and coolant water, with hardline controls simulating astronaut functions. During the 2-hour prelaunch hold, a small leak was suspected in the secondary oxygen system, but at the end of the hold all systems indicated a "GO" condition and the simulated launch began. System equipment programing started and was recycled at the end of each 22 simulated orbits covering 33 mission hours. Test objectives were attained without any undue difficulty.
In a letter transmitting copies of the Gemini Launch Vehicle Pilot Safety Program to Gemini contractors and other organizations engaged in Gemini development and operations, Air Force Space Systems Division explained that pilot safety philosophy and procedures would be carried over from Mercury-Atlas to Gemini-Titan.
Born: Fuad Muhammad Syafruddin ("Udin"), Indonesian journalist murdered in 1996. The date of his birth was considered unlucky in the Javanese calendar as it fell on a kliwon Monday.

February 19, 1963 (Tuesday)

The publication of Betty Friedan's The Feminine Mystique launched the reawakening of the Feminist Movement in the United States, as well as the spread of women's organizations and consciousness-raising groups.
The results of the 1962 population census of Nigeria were found to be so inaccurate that Prime Minister Abubakar Balewa announced that the count was being scrapped and that a new census would take place later in the year.
Born:  Seal, black British pop music singer, as Sealhenry Samuel, in Paddington, London
Died: Benny Moré, 43, Cuban singer, from cirrhosis of the liver

February 20, 1963 (Wednesday)
Der Stellvetreter, by West German playwright Rolf Hochhuth, premiered in West Berlin at the Volksbühne. The play, which would be translated into 17 languages (including in English as The Deputy), was described as a revival of documentary theatre and based on the thesis that Pope Pius XII was a participant in the Holocaust by failing to speak out against it; the hero of the work was Kurt Gerstein, the Nazi SS Officer who attempted to make the Pope aware of the genocide.
Kenneth S. Kleinknecht, Manager, Mercury Project Office, commented on the first anniversary of John Glenn's flight (Mercury-Atlas 6) that 1,144.51 minutes of orbital space time had been logged by the three crewed missions to date. These flights proved that man could perform in a space environment and was an important and integral part of the mission. In addition, the flights proved the design of the spacecraft to be technically sound. With the excellent cooperation extended by the Department of Defense, other government elements, industry, and academic institutions, a high level of confidence and experience was accrued for the coming Gemini and Apollo projects.
The Smithsonian Institution received the Friendship 7 spacecraft (MA-6 Glenn flight) in a formal presentation ceremony from Dr. Hugh L. Dryden, the NASA Deputy Administrator. Astronaut John Glenn presented his flight suit, boots, gloves, and a small American flag that he carried on the mission.
In announcing a realignment of the structure of the Office of Manned Space Flight, Director D. Brainerd Holmes named two new deputy directors and outlined a changed reporting structure. Dr. Joseph Francis Shea was appointed Deputy Director for Systems, and George M. Low assumed duties as Deputy Director for Office of Manned Space Flight Programs. Reporting to Dr. Shea would be Director of Systems Studies, Dr. William A. Lee; Director of Systems Engineering, John A. Gautrand; and Director of Integration and Checkout, James E. Sloan. Reporting to Low would be Director of Launch Vehicles, Milton Rosen; Director of Space Medicine, Dr. Charles Roadman; and Director of Spacecraft and Flight Missions, presently vacant. Director of Administration, William E. Lilly, would provide administrative support in both major areas.
Born:
Charles Barkley, American NBA player and league MVP in 1993; in Leeds, Alabama
Ian Brown, British alternative rock singer for The Stone Roses, in Warrington
Died: Ferenc Fricsay, 48, Hungarian-Austrian conductor, stomach cancer

February 21, 1963 (Thursday)
Telstar 1, the first privately financed satellite, became the first satellite to be destroyed by radiation. Telstar had been launched from the United States eight months earlier on July 10, 1962, one day after the U.S. had conducted a high altitude nuclear test, and the increased concentration of electrons in the Van Allen radiation belt had caused the communication satellite's transponders to deteriorate.
The Central Committee of the Soviet Communist Party sent a formal letter to the Chinese Communist Party's Central Committee, proposing a summit between the two in order to settle their differences. China would respond favorably on March 9.
The Communist government of East Berlin yielded to public protests and reversed a decision to assign graduating students to specific occupations and prohibit them from applying for other lines of work. A week earlier, high schools had been sent "lists containing the name of each pupil and the job that the state authorities had picked for him or her" as part of the national requirement of one year of manual labor prior to being able to attend a university. Teachers, students and parents had sent letters of criticism. Neues Deutschland, the official newspaper of East Germany's ruling communist organization, the Socialist Unity Party, announced the rescission of the order and criticized it as "bureaucratic, narrow-minded and schematic".
A 5.3 magnitude earthquake destroyed the city of Al Maraj, Libya. The quake lasted for 15 seconds, collapsed 70 percent of the town's buildings, killed more than 300 people, and left 12,000 homeless.
Gordon Cooper and Alan Shepard, pilot and backup pilot, respectively, for the Mercury-Atlas 9 (MA-9) mission, received a 1-day briefing on all experiments approved for the flight. Also at this time, all hardware and operational procedures to handle the experiments were established.
The McDonnell Aircraft Corporation notified the Manned Spacecraft Center that the ultra high frequency transceivers were being prepared for the astronaut when in the survival raft.
Klein's Sporting Goods of Chicago received a shipment of Mannlicher–Carcano rifles from Crescent Firearms Company of New York, including rifle #C2766, which would be used to kill John F. Kennedy.

February 22, 1963 (Friday)

The Presidential Medal of Freedom was established by Executive Order 11085 from U.S. President Kennedy, for the stated purpose of honoring "any person who has made an especially meritorious contribution" in one of three categories, "the security or national interests of the United States", "world peace", or "cultural or other significant public or private endeavors".
China and Pakistan signed an agreement to settle the 280-mile-long border between China's Xinjiang region and Pakistan's Gilgit–Baltistan area, with 775 square miles being relinquished by China to Pakistan.
The fictional cartoon character Pebbles Flintstone was "born" in an episode of the cartoon The Flintstones called "The Blessed Event".
Born: Devon Malcolm, Jamaican-English cricketer, in Kingston

February 23, 1963 (Saturday)
General Ne Win, the President of Burma, ordered the nationalization of all that country's banks. At 1:00 in the afternoon, tanks were sent to the various financial institutions in Rangoon and the private management was forced by troops to relinquish the vaults to the Army.
Canadian politician Marcel Chaput called a press conference to announce the opening of the office of the Parti républicain du Québec (PRQ).
Manned Spacecraft Center checkout and special hardware installation at Cape Canaveral on Mercury spacecraft 20 were scheduled for completion as of this date. However, work tasks were extended for a 2-week period because of the deletion of certain experimental hardware - zero g experiment and new astronaut couch. In addition, some difficulties were experienced while testing the space reaction control system and environmental control system.
Died: Robert Leroy Cochran, 77, American politician and 24th Governor of Nebraska

February 24, 1963 (Sunday)
Women were permitted to vote for the first time in the tiny European nation of Monaco as elections were held for the nation's parliament, the 18-member National Council. The National and Democratic Union party, which had been created by a merger of the two parties that had opposed each other in the 1958 election (the conservative Union Nationale des Indépendents and the less conservative Entente Nationale Démocratique), won 17 of the 18 seats. Charles Soccal, a Communist running on the Democratic Union Movement ticket, won the 18th seat in a runoff election. 
The fifth running of the Daytona 500 was won by Tiny Lund. The first place purse of $23,350 (equivalent to $178,000 fifty years later and $215,000 in 2013 ) was the highest in stock car racing at the time.
Jonny Nilsson won the 10,000m speed skating event, and set a new world record of 15 minutes, 46.6 seconds, to win the World Allround Speed Skating Championships in Japan. Knut Johannesen finished second and Nils Aaness third.

February 25, 1963 (Monday)
The Japanese ferry Tokiwa Maru sank less than 10 minutes after colliding with a much larger Japanese cargo ship, Richmond Maru off Kobe, killing 47 of the 66 people on board. The ferry disaster was one of four fatal ship accidents in a 24 hour period. In the other accidents, The Greek ore carrier SS Aegli capsized in a storm and sank in the Aegean Sea with the loss of 18 of her 22 crew; the four survivors were able to swim to nearby islands. An unidentified Japanese fishing boat and its 11 crew sank in a storm in the East China Sea, and four persons on the Italian oil tanker Miraflores were killed in a fiery collision on the Scheldt River with the British tanker Abadesa.
Born: Joseph Edward Duncan, American serial killer; in Tacoma, Washington (died 2021)

February 26, 1963 (Tuesday)
Armenian-born U.S. inventor Luther Simjian received a patent for his invention of the "Bankograph", a depository machine for receiving and accurately recording (using optical character recognition) deposits of checks, currency and coins and providing a receipt for the customer. U.S. Patent 3,079,603 had been applied for on June 30, 1963. Although the Bankograph, which had been tested by the City Bank of New York while the patent was pending, did not come into widespread use, some of Simjian's optical recognition technology would be incorporated for automated banking.
On February 26 and 27, Gemini Project Office (GPO) decided that spacecraft separation from the launch vehicle would be accomplished manually on spacecraft Nos. 2 and up. In addition, no second-stage cutoff signal to the spacecraft would be required. GPO directed McDonnell to remove pertinent hardware from the spacecraft and Martin to recommend necessary hardware changes to the launch vehicle.

February 27, 1963 (Wednesday)
Juan Bosch took office as the 41st president of the Dominican Republic. His democratically elected government would exist for less than seven months, and be overthrown by a military coup on September 25, 1963.
Female suffrage was enacted in Iran, by decree of the Shah.
Died: Makonnen Endelkachew, 72, Prime Minister of Ethiopia 1943 to 1957.

February 28, 1963 (Thursday)
Chicago Alderman Benjamin F. Lewis of the 24th Ward, the first African-American to be elected to the Chicago City Council from the ward, was found murdered at his office in the 24th Ward's Democratic Party headquarters, two days after being overwhelmingly re-elected to a second term. Lewis had been handcuffed and then shot four times in the back of his head. The murder was never solved.
American comedian Lenny Bruce was convicted by a jury in a Chicago municipal court on charges of obscenity arising from his profanity-laced performance at the Gate of Horn nightclub on December 5.
Dorothy Schiff resigned from the New York Newspaper Publisher's Association, saying that the city needed at least one paper operating during the newspaper strike. Her newspaper, the New York Post, would resume publication on March 4.
The Gemini Project Office (GPO) reported that spacecraft No. 3 had been reassigned to the Gemini flight program. It had originally been scheduled for use in Project Orbit tests, a program of simulated crewed orbital flights in the McDonnell vacuum chamber. Static article No. 1, which had been intended for load tests of the paraglider, ejection seat, hatch, and cabin pressurization, was redesignated spacecraft No. 3A and replaced spacecraft No. 3 in the Project Orbit test program. A McDonnell review of the entire static test program in December 1962 had resulted in eliminating static article No. 1 and making static articles Nos. 3 and 4 the primary structural test articles. No. 3 was subjected to launch, reentry, abort, landing, and parachute loads; and No. 4 to seat, hatch, and pressurization loads plus dynamic response tests. GPO published a bar chart depicting preflight check-out of the Gemini spacecraft in the industrial area at Cape Canaveral. The chart outlined tests on all sections of the spacecraft, the target docking adapter, and the paraglider, from initial receiving inspection through completion of preparations for movement to the launch pad. GPO expected industrial testing to take about 90 working days, based on two full shifts of testing per day and a third shift of partial testing and partial maintenance. GPO reported Rocketdyne's successful achievement of the full 270-second burn-time duration specified for steady-state operation of the orbit attitude and maneuver system (OAMS)  thruster. This had been the primary focus of Rocketdyne's research effort, in line with McDonnell's position that meeting steady-state life operations with the 25-pound OAMS thrust chamber assembly (TCA) was the key to resolving major problems in the development of spacecraft liquid propulsion systems. McDonnell engineers believed that a TCA design able to meet the steady-state life performance required of the 25-pound OAMS TCA would also be adequate to meet pulse-life performance requirements, and that a satisfactory 25-pound TCA would only have to be enlarged to provide a satisfactory  TCA. They were wrong on both counts. Rocketdyne subsequently shifted its primary TCA effort to obtaining life during pulse operation for 25-pound thrusters and steady-state life operation for 100-pound thrusters.
Died: Rajendra Prasad, 78, the first President of India, who served from 1950 to 1962

References

1963
1963-02
1963-02